Merton is a railway station in Merton, Victoria, Victoria, Australia. In 1974, it became a no-one-in-charge station. More recently, it was refurbished as a museum.

The stock yards, platforms, goods shed and gate keeper's cottage were constructed between October 1890 and April 1891. The last passenger train ran through Merton on 28 May 1977, and the last goods train in Feb 1978.

References

External links
 

Railway stations in Australia opened in 1890
Railway stations closed in 1978
Disused railway stations in Victoria (Australia)
Mansfield railway line
1978 disestablishments in Australia